"Ima Korean" is a parody of The Black Eyed Peas' "I Gotta Feeling" by American comedy rapper Rucka Rucka Ali. The song was released on February 20, 2010, as a single to iTunes. It makes fun of then North Korean leader Kim Jong-il as well as the culture, and stereotypes associated with his country and the wider East Asia. The song's cover claimed that it featured Asian–American DJ Not Nice, which is an alias of Ali's.

In June 2010, BBC News reported on the song when a child of Korean heritage was offended by its playback in a school presentation at Portchester School in Bournemouth in the United Kingdom. The principal apologized to the student's mother, stating that the video was 'probably racist'.

Rucka Rucka Ali released an album called Probably Racist in 2011, referring to the incident in Bournemouth. It included the song "We're All Asian", which featured the quote "the principal said DJ Not Nice is probably racist." He later released a sequel called "My Korea's Over" which is a parody of "International Love", taking place after Kim Jong-il's death in 2011, when his son Kim Jong-un took over as the leader of North Korea.

A third song in the series, named "Kim Jong Un Song", was released in June 2013. It references the 2013 Korean Crisis.

Charts

References

2010 songs
Comedy rap songs
Satirical songs
Songs about North Korea
Songs about Kim Jong-il
Black Eyed Peas
2010 controversies